Walter Traut (1907–1979) was an Austrian film producer and production manager.

Selected filmography
 The White Hell of Pitz Palu (1950)
 Behind Monastery Walls (1952)
 Ave Maria (1953)
 Where the Ancient Forests Rustle (1956)
 Fruit in the Neighbour's Garden (1956)
 The Doctor of Stalingrad (1958)
 The Domestic Tyrant (1959)
 Faust (1960)
 Aunt Trude from Buxtehude (1971)
 The Mad Aunts Strike Out (1971)
 Holidays in Tyrol (1971)
 Who Laughs Last, Laughs Best (1971)
 Don't Get Angry (1972)

References

Bibliography
 Giesen, Rolf.  Nazi Propaganda Films: A History and Filmography. McFarland, 2003.

External links

1907 births
1979 deaths
Austrian film producers
Film people from Innsbruck